Ze'ev ( zeév), also spelled Zeev or Zev, is a  name of Hebrew origin which means wolf. The given name is a masculine form used among Ashkenazi Jews. It is a Biblical name, adapted from a reference to Benjamin in Genesis as a "wolf that raveneth".  It re-appeared in relatively recent times as a translation of the Yiddish name װאָלף "Volf" or "Wolf". The name "Wolf" (in German) was relatively common among Germans.

The Bible mentions a person directly named Ze'ev, one of the Midianite leaders defeated by the Judge Gideon (see Oreb and Zeeb). However, the identical modern name is not derived from this character, an ancient enemy whom later Jews had no reason to emulate.

The name Ze'ev or Zev may refer to:

People with the given name

Ze'ev 
Ze'ev (caricaturist) (1923–2002), Israeli caricaturist
Ze'ev Aleksandrowicz (1905–1992), Israeli photographer
Zeev Aram (born 1931), British furniture and interior designer
Ze'ev Almog (born 1935), Israeli admiral
Ze'ev Ben-Haim (1907–2013), Israeli linguist
Zeev Ben-Zvi (1904–1952), Israeli sculptor
Ze'ev Bielski (born 1949), Israeli politician and diplomat
Ze'ev Boim (1943–2011), Israeli politician
Ze'ev Chafets (born 1947), American writer
Ze'ev Drori (born 1940), Israeli businessman
Ze'ev Elkin (born 1971), Israeli politician
Ze'ev Friedman (1944–1972), Israeli weightlifter
Ze'ev Haimovich (born 1983), Israeli football player
Ze'ev Herzog (born 1941), Israeli archaeologist
Ze'ev Jabotinsky (1880–1940), Russian Jewish leader
Ze'ev Maghen (born 1964), Israeli historian
Zeev Maoz (born 1945), American political scientist
Zeev Nehari (1915–1978), Israeli mathematician
Ze'ev Raban (1890–1970), Israeli artist
Zeev Rechter (1899–1960), Israeli architect
Zeev Reiss (1917–1996), Israeli scientist
Ze'ev Revach (born 1940), Israeli actor and comedian
Zeev Rudnick (born 1961), Israeli mathematician
Ze'ev Safrai (born 1948), Israeli historian
Ze'ev Schiff (1932–2007), Israeli journalist
Ze'ev Sherf (1904–1984), Israeli politician
Zeev Sternhell (1935-2020), Israeli historian
Ze'ev Wolf Kitzes (1685–1788), Polish rabbi
Ze'ev Zrizi (1916–2011), Israeli politician

Zev or Z'ev 
Zev Aelony (1938–2009), American civil rights activist
Zev Asher (1963–2013), Canadian musician 
Zev Braun (born 1928), American film producer
Zev Buffman (born 1930), American theater producer
Zev Golan, Israeli historian
Z'ev ben Shimon Halevi (born 1933), English author born Warren Kenton
Zev Hirsch Bernstein (1847–1907), American writer
Zev Kurzberg, British & Israeli Military Official, Explorer & Philanthropist, (1972- to date) 
Zev Siegl (born 1955), American businessman
Zev Sufott (1927–2014), Israeli diplomat
Zev Taublieb (born 1993), American soccer player
Zev Vilnay (1900–1988), Israeli geographer
Zev Wolfson (1928–2012), American businessman
Zev Yaroslavsky (born 1948), American politician

Zehev
Zehev Tadmor (born 1937), Israeli chemical engineer and president of the Technion-Israel Institute of Technology

People with the surname 
Nissim Ze'ev (born 1951), Israeli politician
Oren Zeev (born 1964), technology investor

Fictional characters 
Ze'ev Kesley, fictional character in The Lunar Chronicles fantasy novels

See also
Zev (disambiguation)
Ben-Zeev, a surname
Zev Wolf

Hebrew-language names
Hebrew masculine given names
Jewish masculine given names